The 2010 season is the 57th year in Guangzhou Football Club's existence, their 43rd season in the Chinese football league. The club was relegated to China League One in the fallout of a match fixing scandal despite having achieved the ninth place previous season in the Chinese Super League.

Season reviews

26 November 2009, Guangzhou announced that they were to put Lu Lin, Huang Zhiyi, Xu Liang, Zhou Lin, Cao Zhijie, Wang Xiaoshi, Zhang Si and Tan Ning into the transfer list.
1 December 2009, Peng Weiguo was appointed as the temporary manager of the club.
31 December 2009, the Sports Bureau of Guangzhou took over the club and the club's name was changed into Guangzhou Football Club.
12 February 2010, Guangzhou confirmed earlier in the transfer window that they had agreed a club record fee of ¥2.8 million to sell Xu Liang to Beijing Guoan. Bai Lei joined Tianjin Teda for a fee of ¥1.7 million on the same day.
21 February 2010, Guangzhou was relegated to China League One in the fallout of a match fixing scandal.
28 February 2010, Evergrande Real Estate Group took over the club for a fee of ¥100 million.
11 March 2010, China national team striker Gao Lin signed for Guangzhou from Shanghai Shenhua for a reported ¥2 million.

25 March 2010, it was announced that manager Peng Weiguo had been relieved of his duties, with Korean manager Lee Jang-Soo put in charge.
3 April 2010, Guangzhou's League One 2010 campaign kicked off with a 3–1 home victory over Beijing Institute of Technology. Gao Lin scored two goals in this match.
28 April 2010, Sun Xiang, the first Chinese footballer to play in a UEFA Champions League match with PSV Eindhoven,  announced that he would give up to join Australia's A-League side Sydney FC and sign a long-term contract with Guangzhou instead in the summer transfer window.
29 May 2010, Guangzhou claimed first place in China League One for the first time this season with a 2–1 home win against Guangzhou rivals Guangdong Sunray Cave.
28 June 2010, former China national team captain Zheng Zhi signed for Guangzhou from Celtic on a free transfer.
30 June 2010, Guangzhou confirmed that they had signed Muriqui on a four-year deal from Campeonato Brasileiro Série A side Atlético Mineiro with a domestic record fee of US$3.5 million.

21 July 2010, Guangzhou trounced Nanjing Yoyo 10–0 at Century Lotus Stadium, setting a new club record (also a new record in Chinese professional football league) for their biggest ever League win in the process as well as breaking numerous scoring records.
25 September 2010, Guangzhou beat Guangdong Sunray Cave 3–2 at Boluo Sports Center and promoted to the Chinese Super League for the 2011 season after Hubei Oriental draw 1–1 with Shanghai Pudong Zobon.
16 October 2010, Guangzhou returned to their real home stadium, Yuexiushan Stadium for the first time this season and beat Hubei Oriental International Travel 2–1 in this match.
30 October 2010, Guangzhou successfully achieved League One champions for the second time with a 3–1 victory at home to Hunan Billows. Gao Lin's first half hat-trick ensured he finished the season with the League One top scorer, having scored 20 goals, six more than the 14 scored by second-placed Ye Weichao.

Technical staff

Squad

Transfers

Winter

 In

 

 

 Out

Summer

 In

 Out

Friendly matches

League One

Result summary

League table

Positions by round

Matches

All times GMT+8.

Squad stats
Updated to games played on 30 October 2010.To see the table ordered by certain column title click that column header icon  once or twice.

No appearances player not listed.

References

Guangzhou F.C.
Guangzhou F.C. seasons